Nevena Bridgen (née Pavlovic) is a Serbian opera singer and blogger. She is the wife of British politician Andrew Bridgen, Member of Parliament (MP) for North West Leicestershire. Bridgen is the founder of The Wives of Westminster, a blog about British political wives. Bridgen and her work has been featured in The Times, The Guardian, i, The Independent Vice and other publications.

Early life and training 
Bridgen was born in Belgrade, Serbia, then part of Yugoslavia. She was discovered during the Yugoslav Wars singing in bomb shelters and went on to audition at the Guildhall School of Music and Drama in London. Bridgen is a principal soloist of the National Theatre in Belgrade.

References 

21st-century Serbian women opera singers
British bloggers
British women bloggers
Serbian bloggers
Serbian women bloggers
Singers from Belgrade
Living people
Year of birth missing (living people)
Serbian emigrants to the United Kingdom
Spouses of British politicians